Demyanovo is a rural locality (a selo) in Vokhtozhskoye Rural Settlement, Gryazovetsky District, Vologda Oblast, Russia. The population was 10 as of 2002.

Geography 
Demyanovo is located 71 km east of Gryazovets (the district's administrative centre) by road. Stanovoye is the nearest rural locality.

References 

Rural localities in Gryazovetsky District